Mads Clausen (21 October 1905 – 27 August 1966) born in Elsmark, parish of Havnbjerg, municipality of Nordborg in Denmark, was a Danish industrialist and founder of Danfoss in 1933. He died in transit from Elsmark to Sønderborg.

He married Dorthea (Bitten) Emma Clausen (1912–2016) in 1939. The couple had five children:
 Karin Clausen (b. 1940)
 Bente Clausen (b. 1942)
 Jørgen Mads Clausen (b. 1948), chairman of Danfoss's board of directors
 Peter Johan Mads Clausen (b. 1949)
 Henrik Mads Clausen (b. 1953)

See also
 Universe (Danish amusement park), a Danish science park established by Danfoss

References 

1905 births
1966 deaths
20th-century Danish businesspeople
People from Sønderborg Municipality